The Kapaz PFK 2017–18 season was Kapaz's sixth Azerbaijan Premier League season, and ninth season since their reformation in 2009.

Season events
On 18 November, Shahin Diniyev resigned as manager with Yunis Hüseynov being appointed as his replacement on 20 November.

Squad

Transfers

Summer

In:

Out:

Winter

In:

Out:

Trial:

Friendlies

Competitions

Azerbaijan Premier League

Results summary

Results

League table

Azerbaijan Cup

Squad statistics

Appearances and goals

|-
|colspan="14"|Players who left Kapaz during the season:

|}

Goal scorers

Disciplinary record

References

External links 
 Official website
 Kapaz FC's Facebook page
 Kapaz PFK  at PFL.AZ

Kapaz PFK seasons
Azerbaijani football clubs 2017–18 season